The Dancing Tiger is a children's picture book written by Malachy Doyle and illustrated by Steve Johnson and Lou Fancher, published in 2005. It won the Nestlé Children's Book Prize Silver Award and was longlisted for the Kate Greenaway Medal.

References

2005 children's books
Children's fiction books
British children's books
British picture books
Books about tigers